Hon. Frederick Thomas Brentnall (17 June 1834 – 11 January 1925) was a Wesleyan preacher in  New South Wales and a journalist, businessman and politician in Queensland, Australia. He was a Member of the Queensland Legislative Council.

Early life 
Brentnall was born at Riddings, Derbyshire and educated at Alfreton.

Religious life 
Brentnall was sent by the British Wesleyan Conference to New South Wales in 1863 to join the ranks of the Wesleyan ministry in that colony. An affection of the throat, however, necessitated his resignation about 1883.

Business life 
Brentnall then bought an interest in the Brisbane Telegraph, and joined the literary staff, becoming Chairman of the Company upon the retirement of the Hon. James Cowlishaw in Oct. 1885. Brentnall was a director of several companies, including the Queensland Deposit Bank and Building Society, and the Queensland General Insurance Company, Ltd.

Politics 
Brentnall was appointed a Member of the Queensland Legislative Council on 17 April 1886. Although a lifetime appointment, he held it until the abolition of the Council on 23 March 1922.

Brentnall was also a member of the Coorparoo Shire Council and served as its chairman in 1888 and 1889.

Later life 
Brentnall died in Brisbane in 1925 and was buried in Balmoral Cemetery. He was survived by two daughters: Flora (Mrs E. B. Harris) and Charlotte Amelia Brentnall. His daughter, Flora Harris would help convene the Women's War Memorial Committee in Brisbane, which was instrumental in fundraising to establish a fountain in Anzac Square, following WWI. This fountain which sits alongside the carved panel carved by Daphne Mayo, honoured the men who fell during WWI.

References

1834 births
1925 deaths
Members of the Queensland Legislative Council
English emigrants to Australia
Burials in Balmoral Cemetery, Brisbane